Charles Vincent Paterno (born Canio Paternò, August 4, 1878 – May 30, 1946) was an Italian-born American real estate developer. He was called the "Napoleon of the Manhattan Skyscraper Builders".

Life and career 
Born in Castelmezzano, in the  Italian region of Basilicata, to Giovanni Paternò, a real estate businessman, and Carolina Trivigno, Paterno emigrated to the United States due to financial problems caused by an earthquake which destroyed a construction project that his father was involved with. He graduated from Cornell Medical School in 1899, with the intention of becoming a doctor of medicine but he never practiced the profession. After his father's death, Paterno and his brother Joseph took over the family real estate business. By 1918, the Paternos owned 75 buildings housing about 28,000 people.

The Paterno name is connected to the construction and the development of a number of modern, luxurious apartment buildings in the Upper East Side, Morningside Heights, and Washington Heights neighborhoods of Manhattan in New York City, including:

 The Colosseum (1909–1910)
 The Paterno (1909–1910)
 Hudson View Gardens (1923–25)
 825 Fifth Avenue (1926–1927)
 Castle Village (1938–1939)

Paterno died at the Westchester Country Club on May 30, 1946. He is memorialized by the Paterno Trivium at the intersection of Cabrini Boulevard, West 187th Street, and Pinehurst Avenue in the Hudson Heights subsection of Washington Heights.

Paterno Castle

The centerpiece of Paterno's seven-acre (2.8 ha) estate, located in what is now the Hudson Heights neighborhood of Manhattan, New York City, was Paterno's Castle, a Neo-Gothic four-story 35-room mansion.

Reportedly inspired by a European castle whose surroundings reminded Paterno of the Fort Washington area, the castle was designed by John C. Watson and built at the cost of over $500,000 (at least $ today). The building's white marble facade featured turrets. The entrance was a  underground passageway that went under the building's front. 

Although the building's facade was medieval, the interior design was not. Each room was decorated in a different style: Louis XV for the parlor, Colonial for the dining room, Asian for the library. An antique clock in the entrance hall triggered chimes on the hour and half-hour in the castle's tower and, at certain times of the day, operated a $7,000 organ on the second floor gallery. The organ was expanded in 1910, 1911, 1913, and 1927, at the cost of tens of thousands of dollars. When the Castle was slated for demolition, the organ was purchased and donated to St. Paul's Episcopal Church in Glen Cove, New York.

The second floor was the location of the bedrooms, each entered through its own vestibule, as opposed to directly from the hallway. The master bedroom measured 20 feet by 80 feet (6.1m by 25m). The floor also had a nursery and a sewing room. 

On the third floor were the banquet hall and ballroom, each  with  ceilings, and a billiard room.  The ballroom had balconies with views of the Hudson.  

Half of the roof was dedicated to a roof garden with a foot and a half of soil.  It featured a large conservatory, an aviary, and a solarium.

The basement had massage rooms, Turkish baths, a grill room, a lounge, and a swimming pool that was surrounded by birdcages and filled with filtered water from the nearby Hudson River. One cellar was dedicated to raising mushrooms, called the "mushroom vault". 

The grounds featured Italian gardens, greenhouses, colonnades, fountains, and pergolas.  At its height, the garage held five Rolls-Royces.

Paterno moved in in 1909, although the building was not completed until 1916.

The completed castle survived barely two decades. Paterno presently moved to Greenwich, Connecticut, and in 1938 he razed the castle and most of the rest of the estate to erect the "Castle Village" complex of co-operative apartments.  The area was becoming increasingly residential, and The New York Times quoted Paterno as saying that "the many improvements in that part of the city...had led to a strong residential movement in that area with a definite demand for the finer type of garden type apartments."

Guest House

The former guest house of the estate is a remnant leftover after the estate's redevelopment.  Located at 16 Chittenden Avenue at the corner of West 186th Street, the house was built around 1925, and sits on a  pier suspended over a sheer drop to the Henry Hudson Parkway and the Hudson River Greenway. It was commissioned by Cleveland Walcutt, an engineer, who built it on land he purchased from the estate of the editor of the New York Herald, James Gordon Bennett Jr. The house is sometimes referred to locally as "The Pumpkin House", because of its orange color when lit up at night.

The three-story, house is configured as a two-family home with separate rental one-bedroom apartment.  The main unit includes a parlor floor, a dining room. a library, and a "French country" kitchen.  The living room and balcony afford views of the downtown Manhattan skyline, as well as the George Washington Bridge and the Hudson River.  On clear days, the new Governor Mario M. Cuomo Bridge (Tappen Zee Bridge) connecting Westchester and Rockland counties can be seen to the north.  Upstairs are two master bedrooms, two additional bedrooms which can also be used as studies, and two full bathrooms.

The house was bought in 2000 for $1.1 million. By 2010 the house had only had four owners, and sold c.2011 for around $3.9 million.  In 2016, it was put on the market at the asking price of $5.25 million, and after almost three years, it was  sold in January 2019 for $2 million.

Several other remnants of the estate are still extant as part of the Castle Village complex.

Retaining wall
One remnant of the Paterno estate is the 75-foot retaining wall built to protect Riverside Drive; it now protects the Henry Hudson Parkway. On May 12, 2005, the wall collapsed, producing a landslide that buried the northbound lanes of the parkway and six parked cars. No one was injured. The road re-opened to traffic on May 15, but an entry ramp to the highway remained closed for almost two years. A later study found that the collapse could have been prevented.

Reconstruction of the wall, which had been built in 1925, was substantially completed by October 2007, at the cost of $24 million. The access ramp to the Henry Hudson Parkway below the wall was partially reopened in March 2008. All reconstruction on the wall, including the full opening of the access ramp was complete by November 2010.

Gallery

References
Notes

Further reading
"Charles V. Paterno: His Castle Ruled Washington Heights" Keith York City

External links

1878 births
1946 deaths
People from Castelmezzano
Weill Cornell Medical College alumni
American real estate businesspeople
Italian emigrants to the United States
Washington Heights, Manhattan